Pilgrimage was a demoparty which took place annually in Salt Lake City, Utah each summer between 2003 and 2006.  The event was founded by Rich "Legalize" Thompson of the demoscene group Polygony.
  Pilgrimage was, at the time, the only active demoscene event of its kind in all of North America (succeeding events such as NAID), while many demoparties take place annually throughout Europe.

Party features

Competitions 
Pilgrimage hosted a variety of different compos, most of which require a skill in electronic art and/or computer programming, such as:

 Demo
 Combined Music (MP3 and tracked music)
 Pixel Graphics
 Text Mode Graphics
 "Blender" competition (equivalent to fast-compos at European demoparties)
 "Wildcard" (equivalent to wild-compos at European demoparties)

In 2004, Pilgrimage managed to raise over US $14,000 in cash and prizes to award winners of each of the various competitions, double that of the previous year.   Major sponsors that year included Utah's largest independent ISP XMission, ACiD, ATI Technologies, Bawls, Microsoft, and DeviantArt.

Seminars 

In addition to competitions, which are the main focal point of any demo party, Pilgrimage also hosted seminars on art and technology-related subjects such as 3D programming and design, the history of art in computing, and game design.

Activities

Pilgrimage 2004 included the following activities:

 A Dance Dance Revolution tourney, including several "old school/new school" matchups.
 A city-spanning scavenger hunt organized by members the local 2600 meeting.
 A demoscene trivia quiz show hosted by Jason Scott and Severina
 A demonstration of how the popular Finnish cocktail Salmiakki Koskenkorva can be made, including a beverage tasting

In 2004, main organizer Legalize stirred up quite a few attenders during his opening speech of the party, where he (in response to European critics of the party) verbally offended the complete European demoscene, labelling them "Eurotrash". He also delivered a side-jab to attenders from Canada stating that they are "wussies", as they don't have an active demoparty anymore - to which the members of demogroup Northern Dragons responded that the actual party invitation demo was "written by Canadians".  The Northern Dragons gave another tongue-in-cheek response to the controversy in 2005 by naming their winning demo entry "Eurotrash".

References

 The Inception of Computer Graphics — The relationship between Utah and Computer Graphics.
 North American Demo Parties — A list of all North American demo parties.

External links
 Pilgrimage official website
 Pilgrimage 2005 (archived)
 Pilgrimage 2004 (archived)
 Pilgrimage 2003 (archived)
 Pilgrimage demoparty releases indexed at Pouet.
 Pilgrimage 2004 photographs hosted on Slengpung.

Demo parties
Festivals in Utah